Events in the year 1913 in China.

Incumbents 
 President of the Republic of China – Yuan Shih-kai
 Vice President of the Republic of China – Feng Guozhang, Li Yuanhong
 Premier of the Republic of China –
 Zhao Bingjun
 Duan Qirui
 Xiong Xiling

Events
 Republic of China national football team established
 May 29 — Republican Party (China) dissolved
 July 1913 — Second Revolution launched when seven southern provinces rebelled against Yuan
 October 6, the British Foreign Ministry recognized the Republic of China's Beiyang government and established the Embassy of the Republic of China in the United Kingdom of Great Britain and Ireland in the capital of London (in 1927, the country of change was the United Kingdom of Great Britain and Northern Ireland) and sent a minister.
 October 6–7 – Yuan Shikai surrounded Parliament with thousands of military and police impersonating ''Citizens League'' and forced him to elect himself as the official president, while Li Yuanhong as the Vice President.
 November – Second Revolution is crushed by Yuan's government and KMT members go into exile abroad

Births
 Han Xianchu, PLA general
 Jin Yunying (1913–1992), Manchu princess

Deaths
 Song Jiaoren, assassinated, many suspect Yuan Shikai to be behind the plot 
 Empress Dowager Longyu, regent to Xuantong Emperor, last emperor of China

References

 
Years of the 20th century in China